(born December 24, 1982) is a Japanese singer, actor, television personality, radio host and dancer. He is a member of the boy band Arashi.

Aiba began his career in the entertainment industry when he joined the Japanese talent agency Johnny & Associates in 1996 at the age of 13. Prior to his debut as a singer with Arashi in 1999, Aiba started an acting career when he was cast as the lead role of Gordie for the stage play Stand by Me, which was based on the film of the same name. About five years after his debut as a singer with Arashi in 1999, he became one of the co-hosts of the variety show  in 2004, making him the first member of Arashi to regularly participate in a variety show not primarily hosted by Arashi.

Early life 
Aiba was born in Hanamigawa, Chiba as the first child of his family. He has a younger brother who is four years younger. Aiba was raised by his grandparents until he was four years old because his parents were busy running their newly opened Chinese cuisine restaurant then.

Prior to joining Johnny & Associates, Aiba watched a program called  and saw SMAP playing basketball on television. Wanting to play basketball with them, he sent in the application to join the talent agency himself, without exactly knowing what the agency specialized in until the day of auditions.

Music career 

In collaboration with the other members, he has written the lyrics to "Fight Song" and "5x10". For his solo song "Hello Goodbye", Aiba played the harmonica portion of the song throughout Arashi's Arashi Marks 2008 Dream-A-Live and Arashi Marks Arashi Around Asia 2008 concert tours. Aiba also used to play the saxophone; however, due to the collapse of one of his lungs in 2002, he was forced to stop playing due to the operation he had to undergo.

Acting career

Stage 
Aiba began acting in a 1997 stage play based on an American coming of age film called Stand by Me with future bandmates Jun Matsumoto and Kazunari Ninomiya. It was the first stage adaptation of the 1993 film Untamed Heart. In early 2008, Aiba was given the lead role of Colin Briggs in the stage play called Greenfingers, which was adapted from the movie of the same name.

He portrayed a young man hovering over life and death due to a violent traffic accident.

Drama 
In 1997, Aiba made his drama debut portraying Akira, one of the many children left to survive in a city under government lockdown after a mysterious disease wipes out all the adults, in the drama . After the announcement of the formation of Arashi in September 1999 and their position as supporters for the 1999 Volleyball World Cup competition, all five members starred together for the first time in the volleyball-centered short drama V no Arashi.

On August 2, 2009, it was announced that Aiba would not only act in his first drama series in nearly six years but also star as the lead actor for the first time. In My Girl, Aiba portrayed a young man who discovers that he has a five-year-old daughter after receiving the news that his girlfriend, who he has not seen in six years, was killed in an accident.

In January 2010, Aiba co-starred with the other members of Arashi in the human suspense drama special Saigo no Yakusoku. He portrayed , a 28-year-old coffee shop employee who is caught up in a building hijack. Starting January 2011, Aiba starred as genius bartender  in the drama adaptation of the manga Bartender. Aiba also made a guest appearance on the final episode of bandmate Ninomiya's drama , which aired on December 21, 2010.
In April 2012, Aiba once again starred in a lead role as "Katayama Yoshitaro" in the NTV drama adaption of the similarly named novel series, " Mikeneko Holmes no Suiri (三毛猫ホームズの推理).
In 2013, took the lead role as a doctor in "Last Hope".

Film 
He subsequently reprised his role for the 2004 sequel .

Other ventures

Radio 
Since October 5, 2001, Aiba has his own radio show Arashi's Aiba Masaki no Rekomen! Arashi Remix, which currently broadcasts on JOQR. On May 17, 2009, Aiba hosted a special radio program on Tokyo FM called .

Variety show host 
In 2004 Aiba became a regular part of Ken Shimura's variety show Tensai! Shimura Dōbutsuen. With co-hosts of the show such as Tomomitsu Yamaguchi, Sayaka Aoki and Becky, Aiba interacts with various wild animals such as tigers, pandas and crocodiles in zoos both in and out of Japan, such as Singapore, South Africa, Philippines and Indonesia. After Shimura's passing on March 29, 2020, Aiba was given the lead of the show. The name for the show remained as a tribute to Shimura. As of June 3, 2020, NTV decided to end broadcasting "Tensai!" in September, stating as a reason that to continue filming on that stage, with all the memories gathered throughout almost 16 years that the show was on air, would be painfully difficult and heartbreaking. However, Aiba would continue as host of a new program with basically the same theme: the love for animals. The new show, started airing in October.The show's format and name remained until April 2022, when it was renamed , focusing now on the people who take care of rescued animals, mainly dogs and cats.Aiba, besides hosting the show, has an occasional corner trimming and washing rescued dogs, as part of his desire to take care of animals.

In 2013 Aiba began hosting a variety show Aiba Manabu airing in TV Asahi. Aiba enriches his knowledge about Japan along with the audience in the show.

In 2014 he also became one of the hosts for Tokyo Live!, a special live show that aired TV Tokyo for two weeks. 5 Johnny's member alternated hosting the show every night from Mondays to Fridays wherein they try to offer advice as some audience called about their woes. Aiba was the Wednesday host. Due to popularity, the show became a regular show but lost its live format. It is currently called Ichigen-san

In 2016 he began hosting a sports show in NHK called Gutto! Sports. A warm discussion with an invited athlete occurs every week.

Starting in January 2021, Aiba hosts the program VS Damashii (VS魂), which substituted Arashi's signature program VS Arashi, ended in December 2020.

Music show host 
As part of Arashi, he led NHK's Kouhaku Uta Gassen's White Team from 2010 to 2014, and as himself, he was the 67th White Team Leader in 2016. He hosted Fuji TV's FNS Kayōsai, aired on December 4 and 11, 2019, together with Mezamashi TV's Yūmi Nagashima. They repeat as hosts for FNS's Spring (2022), Summer (2020-2022),Autumn (2021) and Winter shows (2020-2022)

Field navigator 

Aiba was the official navigator for Fuji Television's coverage of the 2010 World Artistic Gymnastics Championships, which was held in Rotterdam, Netherlands from October 16 to 24, 2010.

He was chosen, alongside his Arashi co-member Sho Sakurai, to host the NHK special program coverage for the Tokyo Olympics and Paralympics, celebrated from July 23, 2021.

On April 4, 2021, Aiba started a new corner in NHK's Sunday Sports, called "Aibuzz", short for "Aiba's Buzz", visiting athletes and sporting spots.

Documentaries and global environmental issues and SDG interest programs 
The series focuses on sisters Suss and Tena and a tanuki named Bull, who are called to fight monsters caused by environmental and social problems. Aiba voices , a haiku poet who reflects about the episode's problem, and, at the end, gives haiku that triggers everyone to think about SDGs. The episodes aired on Tokyo MX and BS Asahi, and are hosted on Koikeya's YouTube channel.

 is NHK's 4K channel's 5-episode series, starting March 18, 2023, in which Aiba, as special navigator, hosts a view at Japan's World Natural Heritage.

Commercials 
CM
 Asahi Group Holdings, Ltd.
 Asahi Soft Drinks "Mitsuya Cider" (2020) with Arashi In 2021-2023, together with fellow Arashi member Sho Sakurai, and including Hey! Say! JUMP member Ryosuke Yamada for Spring and Summer. and Snow Man members Ryohei Abe and Ren Meguro, in a series of commercials
 Asahi Beer "Asahi zeitaku shibori" (March 2018-)
 Bandai Namco Entertainment
 Bandai Co., Ltd. Tamagotchi Mesutchi and Osutchi (1998) ~ with You Yokoyama and Jun Matsumoto
 Calbee Inc.
 Frugra (April 2016-March 2018)
 Potato Chip Crisp (August 2016-March 2018)
 Jagabee (May 2017-March 2018)
 Duskin Co., Ltd. 
 Mister Donut Cotton Snow Candy (June 2014 – 2015)
 EBARA Foods Industry, Inc.
 Ebara Yakiniku sauce Golden taste (March 2016-)
 Ebara Sukiyaki Sauce (November 2016-)
 GungHo Online Entertainment, Inc.
 Puzzles and Dragons (July 2016-2020) ~ with Arashi
 House Foods
 Refreshing Super Catechin (2004)
 Tongari corn (2007)
 Vermont curry  (2009-March 2013)
 House Wellness Foods Co., Ltd.  C1000 Refresh Lemon & Lime (2007)
 Ikeda Mohando Pharmaceutical  
 Liquid Muhi S (2010- )
 Muhi Alpha EX (2010- )
 Kirin Company, Ltd
 Kirin Beverage Company, Ltd
 Kirin Mets Cola (December 2013-February 2016) ~ with Satoshi Ohno
 Kirin Mets (March 2016-November 2016) ~ with Satoshi Ono and Jun Matsumoto
 Kosé Corporation 
 Kosé Cosmeport
 Je l'aime (2013 - 2020) - co-starring with Jun Matsumoto
 Softymo Natu Savon Select (July 2017 -)
 Lion Corporation
 Soflan Premium Deodorant Plus with aroma and deodorant (March 2017-); 2021 with fellow Arashi member Kazunari Ninomiya, in a collaborative visual campaign with Top Super Nanox
 Meiji Co., Ltd.
 Meiji Dairies Corporation
 Meiji Delicious Low Fat Milk (April 2019-)
 Mercedes-Benz Japan
 smart (November 2015-October 2016 / April 2017-April 2018)
 Safe and Secure Campaign Radar Safety Package (April 2017-April 2018)
 Mikakuto Co.,Ltd 
 throat lozenge (November 2011-November 2013)
 throat lozenge EX (November 2011-November 2013)
 Shigekicks Zerosh (July 2012 – 2014)
 Gummy Gum (March 2013 – 2014)
 Kororo (November 2014-October 2015)
 Morinaga & Company
 Morinaga Milk Industry pino ice cream (May 1998 – 2000)
 Nissin Foods
 Koikeya (2021-) alone, (2023) with Sexy Zone's Kento Nakajima
 Sumitomo Life Insurance Company W Stage Future Design (April 2011-March 2015)

Personal life 
On September 28, 2021, Aiba announced his marriage through a letter he released in their fan club website. It was reported on October 23, 2022, via his agency, that he and his wife had welcomed their first born, a boy. The date of birth was not revealed.

Filmography

Television

Film

Stage

Awards

References

External links 
J Storm Profile
Masaki Aiba | Johnny's Net Profile
 

1982 births
Living people
Arashi members
Japanese male pop singers
20th-century Japanese male actors
Japanese male film actors
Japanese male stage actors
Japanese male television actors
Japanese pop musicians
Japanese male idols
Japanese television personalities
People from Chiba (city)
21st-century Japanese male actors
Musicians from Chiba Prefecture
21st-century Japanese singers
21st-century Japanese male singers